A head shadow (or acoustic shadow) is a region of reduced amplitude of a sound because it is obstructed by the head. It is an example of diffraction.

Sound may have to travel through and around the head in order to reach an ear.  The obstruction caused by the head can account for attenuation (reduced amplitude) of overall intensity as well as cause a filtering effect. The filtering effects of head shadowing are an essential element of sound localisation—the brain weighs the relative amplitude, timbre, and phase of a sound heard by the two ears and uses the difference to interpret directional information.

The shadowed ear, the ear further from the sound source, receives sound slightly later (up to approximately 0.7 ms later) than the unshadowed ear, and the timbre, or frequency spectrum, of the shadowed sound wave is different because of the obstruction of the head.

The head shadow causes particular difficulty in sound localisation in people suffering from unilateral hearing loss. It is a factor to consider when correcting hearing loss with directional hearing aids.

See also
 Interaural intensity difference
 Hearing

References

Sources
 
 
 
 

Acoustics
Otology